is a Japanese manga series written and illustrated by Akimi Yoshida, serialized in Bessatsu Shōjo Comic from 1978 to 1981.

Synopsis
In 1975, wealthy delinquent Heath Swanson drops out of high school and runs away from his home in San Diego, California to live in New York City. While traveling across the United States, he stays in rural Texas, where he meets a group of individuals who decide to join Heath on his journey to New York.

Characters
  
 The protagonist of the series. The youngest child of a wealthy and broken California family, his absentee father and estranged mother led him to become a delinquent and drug addict. His decision to become a runaway and relocate to New York City acts as a catalyst for the events of the series.
  
 A Puerto Rican teenager who Heath meets in Texas. He has lived a hard life in contrast to Heath's wealthy upbringing – he is impoverished, illiterate, and previously worked as a prostitute – but possesses a kind and cheerful disposition.
  
 A painter and interior designer who meets Heath during his travels. A former drug addict, he assists Heath in his rehabilitation.
  
 A teenage con artist who Heath meets and befriends in Texas while staying at a hotel owned by Butch's mother.
  
 Butch's sister, who falls in love with Heath after meeting him in Texas.

Media

Manga
Yoshida, who was twenty years old when California Story was initially published, has said that she drew inspiration for the series from American New Wave cinema (particularly Midnight Cowboy) and the Japanese television drama  (Kizu Darake no Tenshi). The series was serialized in the manga magazine Bessatsu Shōjo Comic from February 1978 until December 1981, and was collected by Shogakukan as eight tankōbon volumes published from November 1979 to April 1982 (listed below). The series has been reprinted as four hardcover bunkobon volumes published from December 1988 to March 1989, and as a four-volume softcover bunkobon set published in November 1994.

Stage play
A revival of the play was staged at The Pocket in Tokyo from July 20 to August 5, 2018, with Kurata returning as director.

Other media
, a California Story art book, was published by Sanrio in 1982.

Reception and legacy
The series has been praised by critics for its unvarnished portrayal of the United States in the 1970s, and has been noted for its frank depiction of racism, poverty, and drug use. The series is regarded as a precursor to Yoshida's later manga series Banana Fish, with both works sharing a New York City setting and a thematic focus on youth romance, urban drama, and homoeroticism.

References

External links
 
 California Story at Shogakukan
 California Story 2008 theatrical adaptation official website
 California Story 2018 theatrical adaptation official website

1978 manga
2008 plays
Akimi Yoshida
Crime in anime and manga
Drama anime and manga
LGBT in anime and manga
Shogakukan manga
Shōjo manga
United States in fiction